Kwun Yam Shan is a village in Sha Tin District, Hong Kong.

Village status
Kwun Yam Shan is a recognised village under the New Territories Small House Policy.

See also
 Kong Pui

References

External links

 Delineation of area of existing village Kwun Yam Shan and Kong Pui (Sha Tin) for election of resident representative (2019 to 2022)

Villages in Sha Tin District, Hong Kong